"In My Darkest Hour" is a song by the American heavy metal band Megadeth. It is the sixth track from their third studio album So Far, So Good... So What! It was released as a promotional single in 1988. The song is frequently performed live by the band. The song was featured in the documentary The Decline of Western Civilization Part II: The Metal Years, where it received a music video as well as featuring on the films official soundtrack released under Capitol. Dave Mustaine has said that the song has one his favorite solos that he has written.

Development 
The music of the song was written by band frontman Dave Mustaine in a single sitting after a friend had contacted Mustaine to inform him of Metallica bassist Cliff Burton's passing. Mustaine was frustrated with the members of Metallica for not contacting him personally, stating in an interview:

The "darkest hour" mentioned in the song refer to general loneliness and isolation, however the lyrics and song subject refer to an ex-girlfriend of Mustaine's. The song was released as a promotional single for the film The Decline of Western Civilization Part II: The Metal Years, in which the song features as part of the film's official soundtrack. Penelope Spheeris stated she had the song close the film "... because everything had been a little light and fluffy before that." And that she needed something "...more substantial."

Critical reception 
Adrien Begrand of MSN Music, said the song is one of Dave Mustaine's "...greatest achievements as a songwriter" and that it is "an all-time metal classic." Mike Stagno of Sputnikmusic said that the song: "...could be considered a classic" and that it "...represents Dave's finest writing, lyrically and musically". Holger Stratmann of Rock Hard, called it an "excellent song". Conversely, Matthew Clouse of Osyssey, said it "...is easily the most overrated Megadeth track of all time" but that he "believe(s) it is a good song, but not a great one."

Music video 
The music video accompanying the song was directed by Penelope Spheeris and featured a trimmed version of the song (from 6:16 to 5:12), intercut with interview footage of the band as well as a live performance of the song. The music video was banned from airing on MTV following accusations the lyrics promoted suicide.

Covers 
In 2012, the Swedish band NonExist, covered the song, with MetalSucks reacting to it unfavorably.

Legacy 
In 2018, Billboard ranked the song 5th on their list of "The 15 Best Megadeth Songs". Loudwire called the song "one of Mustaine's greatest songs" and ranked it as the 7th best Megadeth song. Metal Hammer called it one of the most overlooked Megadeth songs. MusicRadar called it of the 5 songs guitarists need to hear by Megadeth. Penelope Spheeris stated "It's a very, very heavy song and a really kind of classic piece of Megadeth that really displays their philosophy in a beautiful way".

Accolades

Personnel

Megadeth 
 Dave Mustaine - guitars, vocals
 Jeff Young - guitars
 David Ellefson - bass
 Chuck Behler - drums

Production 
 Produced by Paul Lani and Dave Mustaine
 Engineered by Paul Lani with Matt Freeman
 Mixed by Michael Wagener
 Executive Produced by Tim Carr
 Mastered by Stephen Marcussen

References

1988 singles
Megadeth songs
Heavy metal ballads
Songs written by Dave Mustaine
Capitol Records singles
1988 songs